Roddy Ellias (born 1949) is a Canadian guitarist, composer and improviser. He performs contemporary new music, jazz, and classical repertoire.

Career
Reviewers have described Ellias as "genius (Bud Freeman), "positively brilliant" (Bill McBirnie) and "exquisite …the kind of subtlety you don't often hear…anywhere."(Mark Miller). He has performed with Lee Konitz, Kenny Wheeler, Tom Harrel, Dr. Lonnie Smith, Nat Adderley, Slide Hampton, Cleo Laine, Pepper Adams, Lew Tabakin, Michel Donato, Mel Torme, Bud Freeman, PJ Perry, Rob McConnell, the Montreal Symphony, the National Arts Centre Orchestra, and Michel Legrand. As an improviser, "American guitarist and writer Matthew Warnock describes him this way: "as close to being a Zen master on the guitar as he can be."

The Ottawa Citizen reviewed a "concert by pianist Marc Copland, guitarist Roddy Ellias and bassist Adrian Vedady", calling it "deeply lyrical and personal original music."

"Ellias has had two concert series at Paradiso with local and imported musicians including an organ quartet with Kirk MacDonald, a Fourth Stage showcase of his own jazz compositions, an Ottawa Jazz Festival concert with Jeri Brown, several festival workshop and Composers' Collective concerts, as well as appearances with John Geggie, Anna Williams, Tena Palmer, Garry Elliott, Petr Cancura, and many others. And his classical compositions were featured at this year's Music and Beyond festival."

References

1949 births
Living people
Canadian composers
Canadian male composers
Canadian guitarists
Canadian jazz guitarists
Canadian male guitarists
Canadian male jazz musicians